The Newburgh Taylor–mades was a primary name of the minor league baseball teams based in Newburgh, New York. Between 1886 and 1914, Newburgh teams played under numerous nicknames as members of the Hudson River League (1886, 1888, 1903–1907), 1913 New York-New Jersey League in 1914 Atlantic League, hosting home games at the West End Park and Driving Park. 

Baseball Hall of Fame member Dan Brouthers managed the 1906 Newburgh Hill Climbers.

History

Hudson River League 1886, 1888, 1903–1907
Newburgh began minor league play in 1886. Newburgh fielded a team in the 1886 Hudson River League, playing under Manager Sandy McDermott. Newburgh finished with a record of 37–22, playing under manager Henry Lawson. Newburg placed 2nd in the Hudson River League standings, finishing 7.0 games behind the 1st place Poughkeepsie team. The Hudson River League had no 1886 playoffs.

Newburgh played again in the 1888 Hudson River League. The Hudson River League stopped play on June 6, 1888, with rosters and standings unknown.

In 1903, the Newburgh "Taylor-mades" became members of the Class C level Hudson River League, which reformed after a fifteen–year absence. On March 25, 1903 and on April 1, 1903 meetings were held which resulted in forming the six–team Hudson River League for the 1903 season. The Peekskill Highlanders joined the league as a seventh–team during the season. The Taylor–mades ended the 1903 season with a record of 37–54, placing 6th in the overall standings. Charles Fisher served as manager, as Newburg finished 25.0 games behind the 1st place Kingston Colonials.

The 1904 Newburgh Taylor-mades placed last in Class C level Hudson River League. On September 4, 1904, Poughkeepsie Colts pitcher Jimmy Dygert threw a no–hitter against the Newburgh Taylor–mades, winning 2–0. Poughkeepsie finished with a 39–81 record under managers Charles Fisher, John Green and Fred Taylor. The Taylor-mades placed 6th and finished 35.5 games behind the 1st place Poughkeepsie Colts in the final league standings. There were no 1904 playoffs.

In 1905, the Newburgh Taylor-mades placed 4th in the eight–team Hudson River League. Newburgh ended the 1905 regular season with a record of 60–54, playing under managers Fred Taylor and Henry Ramsey. The Taylor-mades finished 6.0 games behind the champion Hudson Mariners in the final standings.

The Newburgh Hill Climbers continued play in the 1906 Hudson River League. Newburgh ended the season in 5th place with a 43–45 record, led by managers Dan Brouthers, Fred Ochs, Billy Taylor and Fred McGratty. On September 9, 1906, Newburgh was 16.0 games behind the 1st place Paterson Invaders when the Hudson River League ceased play for the season. Brouthers was elected to the Baseball Hall of Fame.

The six–team Class C level Hudson River League resumed play to begin the 1907 season. The Newburgh Hillies were in 2nd place on June 18, 1907 when the Hudson River League permanently folded. The Hudson River league was down to four remaining teams, after having the Kingston and Paterson franchises fold in early June. The Newburg Hillies were managed by Jim Connor and had a 15–11 record, and stood 1.5 games behind the 1st place Poughkeepsie Colts when the league folded.

New York-New Jersey League 1913/Atlantic League 1914

Newburgh returned to play in 1913 and finished last in the league standings. The Newburgh Dutchmen became members of the six–team Class D level New York-New Jersey League, placing 6th in the 1913 standings. The Dutchmen finished with a record of 41–54, playing under manager Archie Marshall, finishing 24.5 games behind the 1st place Long Branch Cubans. Long Branch (65–29) was followed by the Poughkeepsie Honey Bugs (48–49), Kingston Colonials (45–46), Middletown Middies (42–51), Danbury Hatters (43–55) and Newburgh Dutchmen (41–54) in the final league standings.

The 1914 Newburgh Hillclimbers continued league play in the renamed eight–team Class D level Atlantic League, which had been called the New York–New Jersey League a year earlier. Playing under managers Andrew Marshall and Todd Waterman, Newburgh finished with a 40–48 record, to place 6th in the Class D level Atlantic League final standings, finishing 21.0 games behind the 1st place Poughkeepsie Honey Bugs. Poughkeepsie finished in 1st place with a record of 65–31, followed by the Newark Cubans/Long Branch Cubans (59–32), Middletown Middies (47–45), Danbury Hatters (49–48), Perth Amboy Pacers (44–49), Newburgh Hill Climbers (40–48), Paterson Silk Citys (32–54) and Bloomfield-Long Branch Cubans/Asbury Park Sea Urchins (30–59) in the final standings. The league had no playoff system and folded after the 1914 season.

Newburgh was without a minor league team until the 1946 Newburgh Hummingbirds played a partial season as members of the Class D level North Atlantic League.

The ballparks
In the seasons between 1903 and 1913, Newburgh minor league teams hosted minor league home games at West End Park.

In 1914, the Newburgh Hillclimbers reportedly played home games at Driving Park. The site today is Delano-Hitch Stadium.

Notable alumni

Baseball Hall of Fame alumni
Dan Brouthers (1906) Inducted, 1945

Notable alumni
Harry Betts (1904)
John Ganzel (1914)
Sam Hope (1913–1914)
Mike Jacobs (1906)
Joe Lake (1905–1906)
George Lowe (1914)
Jim Riley (1906)

See also
Newburgh Dutchmen playersNewburgh Hill Climbers playersNewburgh Hillclimbers playersNewburgh Taylor-mades players

References

External links
Baseball Reference

Defunct minor league baseball teams
Professional baseball teams in New York (state)
Defunct baseball teams in New York (state)
Baseball teams established in 1903
Baseball teams disestablished in 1905
Newburgh, New York
Hudson River League teams